Escolástico Fuentes (c. 1800 – c. 1860) was one of five interim mayors of Ponce, Puerto Rico, during the period of 14 February 1854 to 24 July 1854.  The other four interim mayors during that six-month period were Julio Duboc, Pablo Manfredi, José Benito Paz Falcón, and Antonio E. Molina.

See also

 List of Puerto Ricans
 List of mayors of Ponce, Puerto Rico

References

Mayors of Ponce, Puerto Rico
19th-century Puerto Rican people
1800s births
1860s deaths
Year of birth uncertain
Year of death uncertain